Balle is a surname. Notable people with the surname include:

Carl Christian Nicolaj Balle (1806–1855), Danish composer, editor, and pastor
Francis Balle (born 1939), French academic
Solvej Balle (born 1962), Danish writer

See also
Ballen (surname)